Napravnik or Nápravník is a Czech surname. Notable people with the surname include:

Eduard Nápravník (1839–1916), Czech conductor and composer
Rosie Napravnik (born 1988), American jockey

Czech-language surnames